The effects of Hurricane Floyd in New York included two deaths and millions of dollars in damage. Hurricane Floyd, once a large and powerful Category 4 hurricane, made landfall in North Carolina and moved northward along the East Coast, making landfall on Long Island as a tropical storm. The threat of the hurricane prompted schools in New York City to close for the first time since 1996, and 20 shelters were opened. Floyd produced flooding rainfall and gusty winds throughout the state, from the southern Hudson Valley to the Lake Champlain area. The flood waters damaged multiple roads and forced residents to evacuate from certain locations. Strong winds left as many as 100,000 people without power and brought down a high number of trees due to the saturated ground. In the aftermath of the storm, 15 counties in eastern New York were declared eligible for state or federal assistance. Damage throughout the state totaled $31.987 million.

Background and preparations

The system moved west-northwestward, and intensified into a tropical storm on September 8. Continuing to intensify, Floyd attained hurricane strength on September 10. The hurricane ultimately peaked as a Category 4 hurricane on the Saffir–Simpson Hurricane Scale as it struck the Bahamas. The storm turned northwestward and soon northward, brushing the coast of Florida and the southeast United States. On September 16, Floyd made landfall as a Category 2 hurricane in North Carolina, and moved northeastward along the Eastern Seaboard. It passed through the Mid-Atlantic States as it deteriorated into a tropical storm, and lost its tropical identity over southern Maine.

In advance of the storm, starting on September 15, tropical cyclone watches and warnings were issued for much of the Eastern Seaboard, including portions of New York. These warnings were discontinued by September 19. New York City Mayor Rudolph Giuliani urged private businesses to close early and ordered non-emergency city workers to return home between 12 pm and 3 pm on September 17. For the first time since 1996, in an "almost unprecedented" decision, schools in the city were closed due to the hurricane's threat. On September 16, 20 shelters were opened, able to accommodate as many as 70,000 people. Lawrence Reuter, president of New York City Transit, reported that in an effort to prevent flooding, storm drains were cleared and other precautions were taken. People were urged to remove loose objects that could be blown around by high winds. By September 16, city officials had distributed 50,000 brochures on preparing for the storm. Suffolk County Executive Robert J. Gaffney advised residents of Fire Island to evacuate before the storm made leaving by ferry impossible, and in Long Beach, officials readied emergency vehicles. Also, 4,000 sandbags were given out there in anticipation of high storm tides.

Impact

Tropical Storm Floyd made landfall on western Long Island as it moved northward. The heaviest rainfall associated with the storm was concentrated in the southeastern section of the state. Several meteorological elements worked to enhance the moisture from the cyclone. Rainfall totals exceeding  were common, with as much as  reported locally in the Catskills. At Cairo,  of rain fell. The precipitation, combined with that of Hurricane Dennis earlier in the month, helped to alleviate persistent drought conditions. Floyd also produced gusty winds, reaching  at Stewart International Airport, worsened by a pressure gradient between the storm and an area of high pressure over the Ohio Valley.

Floyd's rainfall resulted in deadly and extensive flooding that killed two people in New York. Heavy flooding was reported along numerous creeks, including the Esopus, Catskill, and Schoharie. In the Albany area, the Normanskill rose to extremely high levels, and the resultant flood waters damaged nearby buildings. The Coeymans Creek in Selkirk overflowed and forced 20 families to leave their homes. The main rivers typically remained within their banks. Many roads, including U.S. Route 20 in Guilderland, were flooded or washed out, and seven families had to be evacuated along NY 32 in Menands. Further south, the Saw Mill and Bronx rivers both overflowed, and caused urban flooding. A dam on a mill pond broke near Lake Placid, leading to flooding along the Chubb River.

The strong winds, combined with saturated ground from the rainfall, brought down trees in widespread areas of the Hudson Valley and Capital District. Many of the trees would not have otherwise fallen in drier conditions. Some of the downed trees fell on structures. In a narrow swath in the Wolf Pond Valley of Warren County, where wind gusts are estimated to have reached , hundreds of trees were blown down. At the storm's worst, power outages affected over 100,000 people region-wide, and some individuals remained without power for a week. At the Albany International Airport, the storm forced the cancellation of flights, and throughout the region schools were closed. Several boats sustained damage along the shore of Lake Champlain. Throughout Orange, Putnam, Rockland, and Westchester counties, initial cost estimates were $14.6 million, although that figure represents only a portion of the actual monetary damage. The storm also caused about $2 million in property damage in Essex County.

Aftermath
Following the storm, three New York counties were declared eligible for individual assistance, eight for individual and public assistance, and four for public assistance. The initial deadline to apply for state or federal assistance was set for November 17, although it was extended a month due to a steady flow of applications. Three disaster recovery centers were opened to provide information to residents affected by the storm. The three centers, located in Rockland, Putnam, and Westchester counties, closed in late October.

See also

List of New York hurricanes
Effects of Hurricane Floyd in Pennsylvania
Effects of Hurricane Floyd in New England

References

External links
Floyd Tropical Cyclone Report 

New York
Floyd
1999 in New York (state)
Floyd